The 54th Dan Kolov & Nikola Petrov Tournament,  was a sport wrestling event held in  Sofia, Bulgaria between 29 and 31 January 2016.

This international tournament includes competition in both men's and women's freestyle wrestling and men's Greco-Roman wrestling. This tournament is held in honor of Dan Kolov who was the first European freestyle wrestling champion from Bulgaria and  European and World Champion Nikola Petroff.

Event videos
The event was air freely on the Bulgarian Wrestling Federation Live YouTube channel.

Medal table

Medal overview

Men's freestyle

Greco-Roman

Women's freestyle

Participating nations

222 competitors from 27 nations participated.
 (1)
 (19)
 (8)
 (3)
 (66)
 (2)
 (1)
 (5)
 (6)
 (1)
 (22)
 (1)
 (14)
 (1)
 (7)
 (9)
 (6)
 (13)
 (2)
 (1)
 (11)
 (1)
 (7)
 (7)
 (1)
 (6)

References 

2016 in European sport
2016 in sport wrestling
January 2016 sports events in Europe
2016 in Bulgarian sport